The Eliphalet Howd House is a historic house at 675 East Main Street in Branford, Connecticut.  Probably built about 1730, it is one of the town's few surviving 18th-century houses, and a good example of a two-story Georgian colonial house.  It was listed on the National Register of Historic Places in 1988.

Description and history
The Eliphalet Dowd House is located in eastern Branford, on the south side of East Main Street (United States Route 1) at Sycamore Lane.  It is set near the road, on a property shared by a local private school.  It is a -story wood-frame structure, with a side-gable roof and clapboarded exterior.  The front facade is five bays wide, with sash windows arranged symmetrically about the center entrance.  The entrance has a transom window, and is flanked by pilasters which rise to a frieze and cornice.  The second story has a slight overhang above the first floor, and the gable ends on the sides have a similar overhang as well.  The main roof cornice has a line of dentil moulding.  The house had a stone chimney at its center, which is no longer visible above the roof line.

The house has traditionally been ascribed a construction date of 1754, but land record analysis suggests it is older, and may have been built as early as 1730.  Its architectural features suggest a date no later than the third quarter of the 18th century.  The house is one of a small number of two-story 18th-century houses in Branford.

See also
National Register of Historic Places listings in New Haven County, Connecticut

References

Houses on the National Register of Historic Places in Connecticut
National Register of Historic Places in New Haven County, Connecticut
Colonial architecture in the United States
Houses completed in 1730
Houses in Branford, Connecticut